All for Love may refer to:

Books and plays
 All for Love (play), a 1677 play by John Dryden
 All for Love, a 1996 novel by Raynetta Mañees

Film and television 
  All For Love  (1912 film), a lost Universal film directed by Harry Solter
 All for Love (1933 film), a French-German comedy film directed by Joe May
 All for Love, a 1971 South Korean film starring Shin Young-kyun
 All for Love (British TV series), a 1980s UK anthology series
 All for Love (Colombian TV series), a Colombian telenovela
 All for Love (1998 film) or St. Ives, a TV movie starring Miranda Richardson
 All for Love (2005 film), a South Korean film starring Uhm Jung-hwa
 All for Love (2012 film), a Chinese film

Music

Artists 
 All for Love (band), an Argentine metalcore band from Buenos Aires

Albums 
 All for Love (Brownstone album)
 All for Love (New Edition album)
 All for Love (Timmy T album)
 All for Love, a 2008 album by the Planetshakers band
 All for Love, a 1987 album by Princess

Songs 
 "All for Love" (song), a 1993 song by Bryan Adams, Rod Stewart, and Sting, also covered by E.M.D.
 "All 4 Love", a 1991 song by Color Me Badd
 "All for Love", an unreleased song by The Beatles intended for The Beatles Anthology
 "All for Love", by Eric Carmen from Tonight You're Mine
 "All for Love", by Joe Satriani from Shapeshifting
 "All for Love", by Harry James
 "All for Love", by Hillsong United from Look to You
 "All for Love", by Lady Antebellum from Golden
 "All for Love", by Nancy Wilson from the soundtrack for the film Say Anything...
 "All for Love", by Ronan Keating featuring Guy Sebastian from Keating's album Duet
 "All for Love", by Seal from Seal 6: Commitment
 "All for Love", by Sean Hayes from Flowering Spade
 "All for Love", by Serena Ryder from Is It O.K.
 "All for Love", by Sigala from Brighter Days
 "All for Love", by Whitesnake from Good to Be Bad
 "All for Love (Backpack Remix)", a song by Adriana Evans from El Camino
 "All for Love", by Madison Beer featuring Jack & Jack
 "All for Love", by Tungevaag & Raaban
 "All for Love", a song by Wizkid featuring Bucie from the album Sounds from the Other Side